Eremosaprinus is a genus of clown beetles in the family Histeridae. There are about 10 described species in Eremosaprinus.

Species
These 10 species belong to the genus Eremosaprinus:
 Eremosaprinus baja Tishechkin & Lackner, 2012
 Eremosaprinus distinctus Lundgren in Johnson et al., 1992
 Eremosaprinus falli (Ross, 1939)
 Eremosaprinus hubbardi (Wenzel, 1939)
 Eremosaprinus minimus Tishechkin & Lackner, 2012
 Eremosaprinus opacus (Horn, 1894)
 Eremosaprinus rossi Tishechkin & Lackner, 2012
 Eremosaprinus unguiculatus (Ross, 1939)
 Eremosaprinus verityi Tishechkin & Lackner, 2012
 Eremosaprinus warneri Lackner & Tishechkin, 2014

References

Further reading

 
 
 
 

Histeridae
Articles created by Qbugbot